Western Underground is the title of the major label debut album released by American country music artist Chris LeDoux for Liberty Records. Overall, it is his 23rd album. Although it produced no top 40 singles, the single "This Cowboy's Hat" would be covered by LeDoux's son, Ned LeDoux and Chase Rice for the latter's album Lambs & Lions. "Workin' Man's Dollar" and "Riding for a Fall" were also released as singles. The album peaked at #36 on the Billboard Top Country Albums chart.

Content
"Settin' the Woods on Fire" was previously recorded by many artists including Hank Williams, Johnny Cash, and Little Richard. "Shot Full of Love" was originally recorded by Juice Newton from her 1981 album, Juice. Billy Ray Cyrus would record his own version in 1998. "Cadillac Cowboy" would later be covered by Jerry Jeff Walker, Heather Myles, and Glenn Erickson. Several of the songs on this album are re-recorded versions of songs from LeDoux's earlier albums. "Cadillac Cowboy" was originally featured on 1988's Ledoux and the Saddle Boogie Band while "This Cowboy's Hat" was first recorded in 1982 for his album Used to Want to Be a Cowboy.

Track listing

Personnel
As listed in liner notes
Chris LeDoux - lead vocals, acoustic guitar
Mark Sissel - electric guitar
Gary Bodily - bass guitar
Bobby Jensen - piano, B-3 organ, synthesizer
K.W. Turnbow - drums

Additional musicians
Stuart Duncan - fiddle
Jimmy Mattingly - fiddle
Weldon Myrick - steel guitar
Wayland Patton - backing vocals
Brent Rowan - acoustic guitar, electric guitar, mandolin
Curtis Young - backing vocals

Chart performance

References 

CMT
Allmusic
AOL Music

1991 albums
Chris LeDoux albums
Liberty Records albums
Albums produced by Jimmy Bowen
Albums produced by Jerry Crutchfield